Mary Makhatho (10 August 1965 – 7 August 2017) was a South African actress. She was best known for her television roles in Yizo Yizo, Gaz'lam, Generations and Ga Re Dumele.

Personal life
Makhatho was born on 10 August 1965 in Soshanguve, South Africa.

On 6 July 2017, she was severely injured after a fall. She hit the head during the fall and was in a coma. Then she was rushed to a Johannesburg hospital. Four days later, she was transferred to a Pretoria hospital and placed in high care on 10 July. However, she died on 7 August 2017 at the age of 51 without regained consciousness. She was buried at Block VV Cemetery in Soshanguve on 14 August 2017.

Career
In 1998, she appeared in the SABC2 drama series Kelebone. In 2000, she joined with SABC1 children's serial Soul Buddyz, where she played the role "Beauty". In 2002, she appeared in two serials: Yizo Yizo and Gaz'lam with minor roles. Then she appeared in some episodes as "Puleng" of the SABC1 soap opera Generations. In 2006, she acted in the Canadian CBC serial Jozi-H with the role "Dumisani's First Wife". In 2008, she joined with e.tv soap opera Rhythm City for the role "Connie". After few years, she retired from the show, but rejoined with the show in 2014.

In 2010, she appeared in the e.tv drama serial eKasi: Our Stories with the role of "Nelly". In the same year, she joined with the SABC2 sitcom Ga Re Dumele where she played the role of "Esther Mamoruti Tlhong". The show became very popular where she continued to play the role for five seasons until 2016. In 2015, she joined with the SABC2 drama serial Mamello to play the role "Mosumbuka". In 2015, she acted in the Hollywood blockbuster feature film Duma directed by Carroll Ballard. In the film, she played the critics acclaimed role of "Thandi".

Filmography

References

1965 births
2017 deaths
South African film actresses
21st-century South African actresses
South African television actresses
People from the City of Tshwane Metropolitan Municipality
Accidental deaths from falls